South Carolina Highway 67 (SC 67) is a  state highway in the U.S. state of South Carolina. The highway travels through rural areas of Edgefield, McCormick, and Greenwood counties, as well as part of Sumter National Forest.

Route description
SC 67 begins at an intersection with U.S. Route 378 (US 378) in Sumter National Forest, east-northeast of McCormick, within Edgefield County. South of US 378, the roadway continues as Walker Road. It travels in a fairly northern direction through rural areas of the county. About  later, it enters McCormick County. The highway only travels about  through McCormick County before it enters Greenwood County. When SC 67 leaves the national forest, it passes through Callison. The highway keeps traveling through rural areas until it meets its northern terminus, an intersection with US 25/US 178, south-southeast of Greenwood.

Major intersections

See also

References

External links

SC 67 at Virginia Highways' South Carolina Highways Annex

067
Transportation in Edgefield County, South Carolina
Transportation in McCormick County, South Carolina
Transportation in Greenwood County, South Carolina